Galactic Federation may refer to:

Fictional entities

Film and television
 Galactic Federation in the Doctor Who serials The Curse of Peladon and The Monster of Peladon
 Galactic Federation in Rick and Morty episodes
 Galactic Federation in Lilo & Stitch
 Galactic Federation in The Tomorrow People TV series
 Galactic Federation in Please Teacher! anime TV series
 Galactic Federation of Free Alliances, a rebirth of the New Republic (Star Wars)
 Galactic Federation in  Shingu: Secret of the Stellar Wars TV series
 United Federation of Planets, in Star Trek

Gaming
 Galactic Federation in the Metroid video game series
 Galactic Federation in the Infinite Space video game 
 Galactic Federation in the Time Traveler video game 
 Galactic Federation in The Rings of Kether roleplaying gamebook 
 Galactic Federation in the Gun-Nac video game 
 Galactic Federation in Star Hero roleplaying game
 Galactic Federation in the Elite Dangerous video game
 Galactic Federation in the FTL: Faster Than Light video game

Literature
 Galactic Federation in the Legacy of the Aldenata universe
 Galactic Federation in The Excalibur Alternative by David Weber
 Galactic Federation in The Hazing by Isaac Asimov
 Galactic Federation in Planet of Light by Raymond F. Jones
 Galactic Federation in Legend of the Galactic Heroes by Yoshiki Tanaka
 Galactic Federation in The Angry Espers by Lloyd Biggle Jr.
 Galactic Federation in the Einai series of books by Simon Lang
 Galactic Federation in the Sector General series of books by  James White
 Galactic Federation in the Maschinen Krieger ZbV 3000 universe
 Galactic Federation in The Amazing 3 manga
 Galactic Federation in the books of Pierre Barbet

Other uses
Galactic Federation (ufology), a supposed alliance of extraterrestrial civilizations within the Milky Way
a claimed body of the Ground Crew Project religion
a claimed intra-galactic governing or supervising body cited by James Harder and Haim Eshed

See also
List of fictional galactic communities
Galactic Alliance (disambiguation)
Galactic Empire (disambiguation)
Galactic republic (disambiguation)
Galactic Republic in the Star Wars universe
United Federation of Planets in the Star Trek universe